The 2011–12 Professional Hockey League season was the 20th annual edition of the Ukrainian Hockey Championship held in 2011–12. The season marked the first season of the Professional Hockey League and first time the national title was administered and awarded independently of the Ice Hockey Federation of Ukraine (FHU). Eight teams participated in the league, which was won by HC Donbass-2.

Regular season

Playoffs

External links
 Official website

Uk
Professional Hockey League seasons 
Prof